Ravindra Yadav is an Indian politician. He was elected to the Bihar Legislative Assembly from Jhajha. He is a member of the Bihar Legislative Assembly as a member of the BJP. His father Shiv Nandan Prasad Yadav also served as a member of the Bihar Legislative Assembly from Jhajha until his death.

References

Bihar MLAs 1985–1990
Bihar MLAs 1995–2000
Bihar MLAs 2015–2020
Rashtriya Janata Dal politicians
1955 births
Living people
People from Jamui district
Bharatiya Janata Party politicians from Bihar
Indian National Congress politicians from Bihar
Lok Janshakti Party politicians